The 2013–14 Penn State Nittany Lions basketball team represented Pennsylvania State University. Head coach Pat Chambers was in his third season with the team. The team played its home games in University Park, Pennsylvania at the Bryce Jordan Center as a member of the Big Ten Conference. They finished the season 16–18, 6–12 in Big Ten play to finish in a tie for tenth place. They lost in the first round of the Big Ten tournament to Minnesota. They were invited to the College Basketball Invitational where they defeated Hampton in the first round before losing in the quarterfinals to Siena.

Departures

Personnel

Roster

Coaching Staff

Schedule and results

|-
!colspan=9 style="background:#1C3C6B; color:white;"|  Exhibition

|-
!colspan=9 style="background:#1C3C6B; color:white;"|  Non-conference regular season

|-
!colspan=9 style="background:#1C3C6B; color:white;"|  Big Ten regular season

|-
!colspan=9 style="background:#1C3C6B; color:white;"|  Big Ten tournament

|-
!colspan=9 style="background:#1C3C6B; color:white;"| College Basketball Invitational

Source -

See also
2013–14 Penn State Lady Lions basketball team

References

Penn State Nittany Lions basketball seasons
Penn State
Penn State